Notogibbula preissiana, common name the twin-keeled top shell, is a species of small sea snail, a marine gastropod mollusc in the family Trochidae, the top shells.

Description
The size of the shell varies between 7 mm and 9 mm. The rather thick, deeply umbilicate shell has an orbicular-depressed shape. The 5 to 5½ whorls are separated by profound sutures.  The shells are whitish, conspicuously ornamented with flexuous rosy-brownish lines, and remote spots at the suture and periphery. The first whorls are smooth. The following whorls are spirally, delicately sulcate, with an elevated ridge in the middle. The body whorl is bicingulate, the cinguli elevated and distant. The convex base of the shell is concentrically lirate with the lirae larger around the umbilicus. The umbilical area is sulcate and funiculate within. The aperture is subrotund. The columella is arcuate, not dentate.

Distribution
This marine species is endemic to Australia and occurs off South Australia, Victoria and Western Australia.

References

 Philippi, R.A. 1849. Centuria altera Testaceorum novorum. Zeitschrift für Malakozoologie 1848: 123-128 
 Adams, A. 1853. Contributions towards a monograph of the Trochidae, a family of gastropodous Mollusca. Proceedings of the Zoological Society of London 1851(19): 150-192
 Adams, A. 1855. Further contribution towards the Natural History of the Trochidae; with a description of a new genus, and of several new species, from the Cumingian Collection. Proceedings of the Zoological Society of London 1854(22): 37-41, pl. 27
 Tenison-Woods, J.E. 1877. On some new Tasmanian marine shells. Papers and Proceedings of the Royal Society of Tasmania 1876: 131-159
 Tate, R. & May, W.L. 1901. A revised census of the marine Mollusca of Tasmania. Proceedings of the Linnean Society of New South Wales 26(3): 344-471
 Pritchard, G.B. & Gatliff, J.H. 1902. Catalogue of the marine shells of Victoria. Part V. Proceedings of the Royal Society of Victoria 14(2): 85-138
 Torr, C.M. 1914. Radula of some South Australian Gasteropoda. Transactions of the Royal Society of South Australia 38: 362-368 
 Allan, J.K. 1950. Australian Shells: with related animals living in the sea, in freshwater and on the land. Melbourne : Georgian House xix, 470 pp., 45 pls, 112 text figs
 Cotton, B.C. 1959. South Australian Mollusca. Archaeogastropoda. Handbook of the Flora and Fauna of South Australia. Adelaide : South Australian Government Printer 449 pp

External links
 

preissiana
Gastropods of Australia
Gastropods described in 1848